Tomáš Kudělka (born 10 March 1987) is a Czech professional ice hockey defenceman currently playing for HC TPS of the SM-liiga. He was drafted in the fifth round, 136th overall in the 2005 NHL Entry Draft by the Ottawa Senators of the National Hockey League.

Playing career
Kudělka attracted the attention of pro scouts while playing for Zlin ZPS in the Czech League in 2003–2005. After being drafted by the Ottawa Senators, Kudělka moved to Lethbridge, Alberta, where he played two seasons for the Lethbridge Hurricanes of the Western Hockey League. During those two seasons, Kudělka made brief appearances with the Binghamton Senators, before making the team full-time for the 2007–08 season. He also played for the Czech national Junior team in the 2006 and 2007 World Junior Hockey Championships.

On 20 May 2010 Kudělka returned to Europe signing a contract with HC Budivelnyk of the Russian KHL.

Career statistics

Regular season and playoffs

International

References

External links

1987 births
Czech ice hockey defencemen
Binghamton Senators players
Elmira Jackals (ECHL) players
Lethbridge Hurricanes players
Ottawa Senators draft picks
Sportspeople from Zlín
Living people
HC Budivelnyk players
HC Dynamo Pardubice players
Lahti Pelicans players
PSG Berani Zlín players
Piráti Chomutov players
HC Vítkovice players
Czech expatriate ice hockey players in Canada
Czech expatriate ice hockey players in the United States
Czech expatriate ice hockey players in Finland
Czech expatriate sportspeople in Croatia
Czech expatriate sportspeople in Austria
Czech expatriate sportspeople in France
Expatriate ice hockey players in Austria
Expatriate ice hockey players in Croatia
Expatriate ice hockey players in France